New Granada may refer to various former national denominations for the present-day country of Colombia.
New Kingdom of Granada, from 1538 to 1717
Viceroyalty of New Granada, from 1717 to 1810, re-established from 1816 to 1819
United Provinces of New Granada, from 1810 to 1816
Republic of New Granada, from 1830 to 1858
Granadine Confederation, from 1858 to 1863

New Granada may also mean:

 Nueva Granada, Magdalena, Colombia
 Nueva Granada, Usulután, El Salvador
 Nova Granada, São Paulo, Brazil
 Military University Nueva Granada, Colombia
 Colegio Nueva Granada, Colombia